Abu Zayd or , alternatively transliterated as Abizaid, is an Arabic name and could refer to:

Abu Zayd 
Abu Zayd could refer to:

People
Abū Zayd ‘Abdu r-Raḥman bin Muḥammad bin Khaldūn Al-Hadrami (1332–1406), Arab polymath
Abu Zayd al-Balkhi (b. 850), Persian Muslim polymath
 Abu Zayd Hassan, 9 c. merchant known for leaving an account on the Guangzhou massacre
Abu Zayd al-Hilali, 11th-century Arab leader
As "Abu Zayd", he is the black epic hero and trickster figure of the epic Taghribat Bani Hilal
’Abū Zayd Ḥunayn ibn ’Isḥāq al-‘Ibādī (809–873), Nestorian scholar, physician, and scientist
Abū Zayd ibn Muḥammad ibn Abī Zayd (fl. 1186 - 1219), Persian potter
Abuzed Omar Dorda (b. 1944), Libyan prime minister and permanent representative to the United Nations
Hikmat Abu Zayd (b. 1922), Egyptian Minister of Social Affairs and first female cabinet member
 Nasr Abu Zayd, (b. 1943, d. 2010), Egyptian Qur'anic scholar persecuted for his liberal interpretation of Islam
Abu Zaid Al-Kuwaiti (d. 2005), Kuwaiti Salafist Jihad fighter and suspected al-Qaeda agent

Other uses
Abu Zayd al-Hilali (film), 1947 Egyptian film about the 11th-century Arab leader

Abizaid

People 
Abizaid is a variant transliteration of Abu Zayd. Notable people with the include:

 Amanda Abizaid, Lebanese-American singer, model, and actress. 
 John Abizaid (born 1951), Lebanese-American retired US Army general, former U.S. ambassador, and former military commander of the United States Central Command.
 Christine Abizaid, is a Lebanese-American U.S. intelligence officer who is currently the director of the United States National Counterterrorism Center.